Def Jux Teaser 2005 is a 2005 compilation album released by American hip hop record label Definitive Jux.

Critical reception
David Jeffries of AllMusic gave the album 3.5 stars out of 5, saying: "The risk-taking, edge-embracing hip-hop label's output is much too diverse to be represented by a mere seven songs, but Definitive Jux Teaser 2005 only needs a half-hour to let you know this label's taste is impeccable." He added, "Def Jux has done underground heads a favor by only giving them seven brilliant artists they need to follow fanatically."

Track listing

Personnel
Credits adapted from liner notes.

 Camu Tao – vocals (1)
 Metro – vocals (1)
 El-P – production (1, 5, 7)
 Aesop Rock – vocals (2)
 Blockhead – production (2)
 C-Rayz Walz – vocals (3)
 Rob Sonic – vocals (3, 5)
 Pawl – production (3)
 Ric Ocasek – vocals (4)
 RJD2 – production (4)
 Mr. Lif – vocals (6)
 Akrobatik – vocals (6)
 Isaiah "Ikey" Owens – production (6)
 Cage – vocals (7)

References

External links
 

2005 compilation albums
Definitive Jux compilation albums
Albums produced by Aesop Rock
Albums produced by Blockhead (music producer)
Albums produced by El-P
Albums produced by RJD2
Record label compilation albums
Hip hop compilation albums
East Coast hip hop compilation albums